"It's Alright" is a song by English synth-pop duo Pet Shop Boys, released on 26 June 1989 as the third and final single from their third studio album, Introspective (1988). It reached number five on the UK Singles Chart. Originally performed by Sterling Void and Paris Brightledge, the song came to the attention of Pet Shop Boys on a house compilation issued by DJ International Records in 1987.

The lyrics list a wide variety of serious political issues in the headlines at the time ("Dictation enforced in Afghanistan, revolution in South Africa taking a stand…"), and then offers the positive message of the title—that on its "timeless wavelength", "music is our life's foundation", it "shall last" and ultimately "succeed all the nations to come".

Versions 
"It's Alright" was the last song on the Introspective album and with a length of nine minutes and 26 seconds, it is the longest track on the album and thought to be the Pet Shop Boys' longest track across all albums the band has produced. 
 
After significant remixing including the addition of extra synthesizer melodies, the song was released as a single.   An additional verse in the single version expands the song's concerns beyond the purely political into environmental issues. On the 10" single there are additional lyrics with Tennant saying "there's a boy standing by a river, there's a girl lying with her lover, there's a statesman standing at a crossroads, there's a soldier polishing his gun".

In February 1989, following the song's inclusion on Introspective but before its release as a single, the original version by Sterling Void was re-issued and reached number 53 in the UK singles chart. Void remixed the Pet Shop Boys recording on the second 12" single, titled the "DJ International Mixes". Hercules and Love Affair covered the track on their 2011 album Blue Songs.

Critical reception
Jerry Smith from Music Week wrote, "Seemingly always popping up in the right place at the right time, Tennant and Lowe comment on the world's ills with a perky disco beat and lush synth backing with yet another seductively memorable lyric. Wide exposure is assured." Harriet Dell from Smash Hits commented, "'It's Alright' was originally recorded by a bloke called Sterling Void and was a largish club hit last year. It includes the tinkling piano, the P.S.B's famous synthesised string pluckings and Neil Tennant's plaintive voice. He "wails" on about how the trees and flowers are being destroyed, how people eventually have to die, but the music lasts forever. It's a really "big" arrangement but somehow the excitement of Sterling Void's original has been flattened out."

Track listing

 7": Parlophone / R 6220 (UK)
 "It's Alright" – 4:18
 "One of the Crowd" – 3:54
 "Your Funny Uncle" – 2:16

 10": Parlophone / 10 R 6220 (UK)
 "It's Alright" (alternative mix) – 4:46
 "It's Alright" (extended dance mix) – 10:34

 12": Parlophone / 12 R 6220 (UK)
 "It's Alright" (extended version) – 8:47
 "One of the Crowd" – 3:54
 "Your Funny Uncle" – 2:16

 12": Parlophone / 12 RX 6220 (UK)
 "It's Alright" (Tyree mix) – 8:55
 "It's Alright" (Sterling Void mix) – 5:34

 CD: Parlophone / CD R 6220 (UK)
 "It's Alright" – 4:18
 "One of the Crowd" – 3:54
 "Your Funny Uncle" – 2:16
 "It's Alright" (extended version) – 8:47

Remixes
 Julian Mendelsohn
 "It's Alright" (alternative mix) – 4:46
 "It's Alright" (extended dance mix) – 10:34
 Tyree Cooper
 "It's Alright" (Tyree mix) – 8:55
 Sterling Void
 "It's Alright" (Sterling Void mix) – 5:34

Charts

Weekly charts

Year-end charts

Notes

References

1988 songs
1989 singles
Parlophone singles
Pet Shop Boys songs
Song recordings produced by Trevor Horn
House music songs